KEZJ-FM (95.7 MHz) is a commercial radio station located in Twin Falls, Idaho. KEZJ-FM airs a country music format.

KEZJ-FM is home to the long running "Morning Show with Brad & Jackie."

Ownership
In October 2007, a deal was reached for KEZJ-FM to be acquired by GAP Broadcasting II LLC (Samuel Weller, president) from Clear Channel Communications as part of a 57 station deal with a total reported sale price of $74.78 million. What eventually became GapWest Broadcasting was folded into Townsquare Media on August 13, 2010.

References

External links
Official Website
Flash Stream, MP3 Stream

EZJ-FM
Country radio stations in the United States
Radio stations established in 1977
Townsquare Media radio stations